The 13th FINA World Swimming Championships (25 m) were held at the WFCU Centre in Windsor, Ontario, Canada from 6 to 11 December 2016. These championships featured swimming events in a 25-meter (short-course) pool.

Bidding process
In December 2012, FINA president Julio Maglione announced that Windsor, Ontario had won its bid over Hong Kong, Abu Dhabi, and Ashgabat.

Medal summary

Medal table

Results

Men's events

Women's events

Mixed events

 Swimmers who participated in the heats only and received medals.

References

External links
Official website

 
FINA World Swimming Championships (25 m)
FINA World Swimming Championships (25 m)
2016 in Canadian sports
International aquatics competitions hosted by Canada
Swimming competitions in Canada
FINA World Swimming Championships (25 m)
Sports competitions in Windsor, Ontario
FINA World Swimming Championships